The St. Nicholas Russian Orthodox Church is a historic Russian Orthodox church near Kwethluk, Alaska, United States, on the Lower Kuskokwim River.  In 2017 it is part of the Diocese of Alaska of the Orthodox Church in America

It is a wood-frame structure, resting on a log foundation, and is completely built out of cedar.  It is rectangular in plan, with a gable roof which sported two small onion domes with crosses, but these were blown off by high winds and stored.  The western side of the building has the vestibule area, above which rises a modest square belltower.  It was built in 1935 as a replacement for an earlier church that was built around 1900, and is the oldest structure standing in the Kwethluk area.  It was listed on the U.S. National Register of Historic Places in 1991.

See also
National Register of Historic Places listings in Bethel Census Area, Alaska

References 

Buildings and structures in Bethel Census Area, Alaska
Churches on the National Register of Historic Places in Alaska
Churches completed in 1935
Russian Orthodox church buildings in Alaska
Buildings and structures on the National Register of Historic Places in Bethel Census Area, Alaska